Achaea catella, the banded achaea, is a moth of the family Erebidae. The species was first described by Achille Guenée in 1852. It is found in Africa, including Senegal, South Africa, Réunion and Namibia.

References

External links
 

Achaea (moth)
Moths of Africa
Moths of the Comoros
Moths of Madagascar
Moths of Mauritius
Moths of the Middle East
Moths of Réunion
Moths of Seychelles
Moths described in 1852
Taxa named by Achille Guenée